St. Boris Peak is an ice-covered mountain rising to 1,700 m in Friesland Ridge, Tangra Mountains on Livingston Island in the South Shetland Islands, Antarctica. It is the first or second highest peak of both the mountains and the island along with Mount Friesland (1,700.2 m). The two are connected by a short saddle of elevation 1649 m dominated by ‘The Synagogue’, a sharp-peaked rock-cored ice formation abutting upon the central summit of St. Boris Peak. The peak is also connected to Simeon Peak by Paril Saddle, and surmounts  Huntress Glacier to the northwest and west, and Macy Glacier to the southeast. 

The peak's central summit is rising to 1,685 m, while its highest point ‘The Synagogue’ rises to 1,699 or 1,700 m. The local ice relief is subject to change; according to a Bulgarian GPS survey by D. Boyanov and N. Petkov the elevation of Mt. Friesland was 1,693 m in December 2016, making St. Boris Peak the summit of both Tangra Mountains and the island in that season. According to the American high accuracy Reference Elevation Model of Antarctica (REMA), Mount Friesland is  higher than the central summit of St. Boris Peak and  higher than ‘The Synagogue’. However, according to the 2022 later edition of REMA Mount Friesland is  higher than the central summit of St. Boris Peak and  lower than ‘The Synagogue’.

The peak was first ascended and GPS surveyed by the Bulgarians D. Boyanov and N. Petkov from Camp Academia area via Mount Friesland on 22 December 2016. A different route was followed by the same climbers and N. Hazarbasanov on 15 January 2017, namely from Nesebar Gap via upper Huntress Glacier and Academia Peak.   

The feature is named after Czar St. Boris I of Bulgaria, 852-889 AD.

Location

St. Boris Peak cultural references
The naming of this Antarctic peak after a Bulgarian saint was reminded by the British press in connection with the victory of Boris Johnson in the London mayoral election on 2 May 2008, that particular day being St. Boris's Day in the Bulgarian Orthodox Church.

Maps
 Chart of South Shetland including Coronation Island, &c. from the exploration of the sloop Dove in the years 1821 and 1822 by George Powell Commander of the same. Scale ca. 1:200000. London: Laurie, 1822
 South Shetland Islands. Scale 1:200000 topographic map. DOS 610 Sheet W 62 60. Tolworth, UK, 1968.
 L.L. Ivanov. Livingston Island: Central-Eastern Region. Scale 1:25000 topographic map.  Sofia: Antarctic Place-names Commission of Bulgaria, 1996.
 L.L. Ivanov et al. Antarctica: Livingston Island and Greenwich Island, South Shetland Islands. Scale 1:100000 topographic map. Sofia: Antarctic Place-names Commission of Bulgaria, 2005.
 L.L. Ivanov. Antarctica: Livingston Island and Greenwich, Robert, Snow and Smith Islands. Scale 1:120000 topographic map.  Troyan: Manfred Wörner Foundation, 2009.  
 Antarctic Digital Database (ADD). Scale 1:250000 topographic map of Antarctica. Scientific Committee on Antarctic Research (SCAR). Since 1993, regularly upgraded and updated.
 L.L. Ivanov. Antarctica: Livingston Island and Smith Island. Scale 1:100000 topographic map. Manfred Wörner Foundation, 2017. 
 A. Kamburov and L. Ivanov. Bowles Ridge and Central Tangra Mountains: Livingston Island, Antarctica. Scale 1:25000 map. Sofia: Manfred Wörner Foundation, 2023.

Gallery

Notes

References
 St. Boris Peak. SCAR Composite Gazetteer of Antarctica.
 Bulgarian Antarctic Gazetteer. Antarctic Place-names Commission. (details in Bulgarian, basic data in English)

External links
 St. Boris Peak. Copernix satellite image

Tangra Mountains